Forrest Carl Donnell (August 20, 1884March 3, 1980) was an American attorney and politician who served as a United States senator and the 40th governor of Missouri.

Early life
Donnell was born in Quitman, Missouri. Donnell graduated from Maryville High School in 1900, where his father was once mayor; the Donnells lived in the home that had once belonged to Albert Morehouse, who also served as governor.

At the University of Missouri he was a member of the Kappa Sigma and Phi Delta Phi fraternities. He was also elected as a member of the Phi Beta Kappa, Theta Kappa Nu and QEBH societies. He was valedictorian of the 1904 class and received a law degree in 1907.

In 1907 he moved to St. Louis, Missouri. In October 1911 he and future Senator Selden P. Spencer founded the law firm Spencer & Donnell. Donnell married Hilda Hays in 1913. They had two children, Ruth and John Lanier. In 1917 he was president of the Association of Young Republicans of Missouri; in 1918-1920, a member of the executive committee of the Republican State Committee of Missouri; and in 1919, a president of the 28th Ward Republican Club of St. Louis.

He was the city attorney for Webster Groves, Missouri, a suburb southwest of St. Louis City.

Governor

Donnell was elected governor of Missouri in 1940 and served one term from 1941 to 1945.

He was the first Republican governor after the collapse of the Thomas Pendergast political machine and the only major Republican elected statewide in the 1940 election; Democrats delayed seating him for six weeks until being forced to do so by the Missouri Supreme Court in what was called the "Great Governorship Steal".

Donnell had defeated St. Louis politician Lawrence "Larry" McDaniel by 3,613 votes out of nearly 2 million cast, thanks largely to votes from rural areas.

Donnell's predecessor Lloyd C. Stark had wrested control of federal appointments in the state from the Pendergast machine in 1936.  Consequently, there was unease about a Republican taking over the appointments.

Within hours of the election, several members of the Democratic party met at the DeSoto Hotel in St. Louis to plan a response.  Among those attending were Senator Bennett Champ Clark, St. Louis Mayor Bernard F. Dickmann, Democratic Party Chairman Robert Hannegan, Attorney General Roy McKittrick and state Democratic Chairman C. Marion Hulen.

Their strategy was to charge that Republican votes were fraudulently bought. They sought to use a provision of the Missouri Constitution that allowed the speaker of the house to "count – tabulate – the votes and proclaim to the general public who won".

Donnell was refused to be seated while the speaker investigated the votes.  Governor Stark urged that he be seated.  The Missouri Supreme Court ultimately seated him.

Donnell was a Mason and was elected grand master of the Missouri chapter during his term as governor.  Ironically, Democrat Harry S. Truman was to imply that Donnell helped Truman win the 1940 Senate election because of their Mason bond.

Truman said:

I had a Catholic friend in St. Louis by the name of James E. Wade. He attended a meeting [where] Davis made his usual charges. Forrest Donnell, who afterwards became [Republican] Governor and Senator, was speaking from the same platform. Donnell was just behind me in the Grand Lodge line and would be Grand Master in a year or two.

So Jim Wade went up to him ... and asked him if I could be the low sort of fellow that Davis charged and still be Grand Master of Masons of Missouri. Mr. Donnell said: 'No, Jim, he could not.' That ruined Mr. Davis—I won by 276,000 votes."

Donnell's ambitious plans as governor were largely thwarted, despite the Republican party gaining control of the house of representatives and an equal share in the senate in 1942.

Senator
Donnell was elected to the U.S. Senate in 1944.  In that race, he defeated state Attorney General Roy McKittrick by 1,988 votes out of nearly 1.56 million cast .  McKittrick had unseated incumbent U.S. Senator Bennett Champ Clark in the Democratic primary.  He served from 1945 to 1951.  As senator, Donnell supported the Taft-Hartley Act, other antilabor measures, and lower income taxes. He opposed an excess-profits tax and most foreign aid.  He lost to former U.S. Representative Thomas C. Hennings Jr. by 53.6%-to-46.4% in the United States Senate elections, 1950.

He returned to practicing law and retired in 1956. Donnell served as president of the University of Missouri Alumni Association and as a trustee of the State Historical Society of Missouri.  He died in 1980 at the age of 95 in St. Louis. He is buried in Bellefontaine Cemetery.

References
Specific

General
 Congressional biography
 National Governors Association Biography
 Matthew C. Sherman, "'The Most Serious Senator':  A Reconsideration of Forrest C. Donnell of Missouri and the North Atlantic Treaty", Missouri Historical Review 101 (2007): 78-98.

1884 births
1980 deaths
People from Nodaway County, Missouri
Republican Party governors of Missouri
People from Webster Groves, Missouri
University of Missouri alumni
Republican Party United States senators from Missouri
Burials at Bellefontaine Cemetery
20th-century American politicians